Bathtub Shitter is a Japanese grindcore band formed in 1996. The lyrical content includes many references to nature conservation, politics and feces. Bathtub Shitter have released three albums, two compilation albums, one live album, eight singles, three split singles and two demos.

Discography

Studio albums 
Wall of World Is Words (2000)
Lifetime Shitlist (2003)
Dance Hall Grind (2005)

Live albums 
Shitter at Salzgitter (Live in Germany 2004)

Compilation albums 
Early Yeah(s) (2005)
Angels Save Us plus Mark a Muck (2005)

EPs 
Fertilizer
97+3 Shit Points
One Fun
Mark a Muck
Angels Save Us
Lifetime Shitlist EP
Xmas
Skate of Bulgaria

Split EPs 
Bathtub Shitter / Dudman
Misery Index / Bathtub Shitter
Bathtub Shitter / Japanische Kampfhörspiele

Demos 
No title (1996)
Demo '97 (1997)

References

External links 
 Official Bathtub Shitter website
 Bathtub Shitter at MySpace

Musical groups established in 1996
Japanese death metal musical groups
Japanese thrash metal musical groups
Grindcore musical groups
Musical groups from Osaka
Tumult Records artists